The 2019 DTM Zolder round is a motor racing event for the Deutsche Tourenwagen Masters held between 18 and 19 May 2019. The event, part of the 33rd season of the DTM, was held at the Circuit Zolder in Belgium.

Results

Race 1

Qualifying

 – Car #99 sent to the rear of field having made illegal modifications under Parc Fermé conditions.

Race

 – Drivers did not complete 75% of the race distance, and therefore are not classified as finishers in the official results.

Race 2

Qualifying

Race

Championship standings

Drivers Championship

Teams Championship

Manufacturers Championship

 Note: Only the top five positions are included for three sets of standings.

See also
 2019 W Series Zolder round

References

External links
Official website

|- style="text-align:center"
|width="35%"|Previous race:
|width="30%"|Deutsche Tourenwagen Masters2019 season
|width="40%"|Next race:

DTM Zolder
2019 in Belgian sport
2019 in motorsport